Dzodze Penyi Senior High School is located in the Ketu North District of the Volta Region, Ghana. The school was established in 1963 as a college for teacher training. The high school has 44 permanent teachers, 35 non-teaching staff, one service person and one Peace-Corps volunteer. The motto of the School is 'Stoop to Conquer.' These words were taken from a comedy titled She Stoops to Conquer, which was written by Irish author Oliver Goldsmith.

History
First principal S.S. Dogbe transferred from St. Francis Teacher Training College in Hohoe in the Volta Region. In 1972, the training college was changed into a secondary school. After the change, a new principal, Tordzro, was appointed. He was assisted by Dick Ametewee.

The Ministry of Education made the decision to reject some Teacher Training Colleges in Ghana in 1971 and Dzodze Training College was one of them. Students of the training college were transferred to the Akatsi Teacher Training College, and only the last batch of teachers were left. Admission of secondary school students began in the 1971–1972 academic year.

The school has a library, science resource center, computer laboratory, visual arts workshop, boarding facility, and a standard playing field. The school enrolls 970 students; 560 male and 410 female.

Academic programs
Programs offered by the school include:

 General Arts
 General Science
 Agricultural Science
 Visual Arts
 Home Economics 
 Business

Facilities
Over the years, classrooms, an administration block, and a boys dormitory were built for the students. A 540-capacity girls’ dormitory for completed in 2009. The Ghana Education Trust Fund (GETFund) project, executed by John Mock Construction Works, is expected to address the major challenges that female students of the school go through in their search for good residential accommodation. Then Headmaster John F.Q. Agbadi, lamented the lack of staff bungalows, which was making supervision difficult in view of the increasing student population. The school has no gates and clean water.

Headmasters

Notable alumni

Stephen Normeshie, chief executive officer of Ghana Export Promotion Authority
Emmanuel Salu, Director at Environmental Protection Agency, Accra
Lawrence Akpeleafashie, Circuit Supervisor Ghana Education Service
Yaw Tettegah, Divisional Commander - Ghana Police Service. Airport
Emmanuel Srofenyoh, Deputy Director - Ridge Hospital. Accra
Charles Nornoo, Project Coordinator - Ghana Commercial Agriculture Project
Nana Osarfo Kantanka, Managing Director - TAQA GHANA, Takoradi International Company

See also
Education in Ghana 
List of senior secondary schools in Ghana
She Stoops to Conquer

References

Boarding schools in Ghana
High schools in Ghana
Education in Volta Region
Educational institutions established in 1972
1972 establishments in Ghana